Ahmed Sobhi (born March 4, 1991) is an Egyptian professional footballer who plays as a right-back for the Egyptian club El Gouna FC.

He also played with Egyptian National Teams U20, U23 and the first team, his international debut was during a 2–1 away loss against Sierra Leone in 2013 African Cup on Nations qualifications on September 3, 2011. In 2015, he renewed his contract with Enppi by signing a 5-year contract.

References

External links

1991 births
Living people
Egyptian footballers
Egypt international footballers
Egypt youth international footballers
Association football defenders
Egyptian Premier League players
ENPPI SC players
Al Mokawloon Al Arab SC players
Petrojet SC players
Smouha SC players
El Gouna FC players